Auvinen is a Finnish surname. Notable people with the surname include:

 Aleksander Auvinen (1857–1918), Finnish Lutheran priest and politician
 Vili Auvinen (1931–1996), Finnish actor and theatre director
 Pekka-Eric Auvinen (1989–2007), Finnish mass murderer
 Henri Auvinen (born 1993), Finnish ice hockey player

Finnish-language surnames